Víctor Manuel Torres Herrera (born 12 February 1958) is a Mexican politician affiliated with the National Action Party. As of 2014 he served as Senator of the LVIII and LIX Legislatures of the Mexican Congress representing Colima and as Deputy of the LVII Legislature.

References

1958 births
Living people
Politicians from Veracruz
People from Martínez de la Torre
Members of the Senate of the Republic (Mexico)
Members of the Chamber of Deputies (Mexico)
National Action Party (Mexico) politicians
21st-century Mexican politicians